Sauto may refer to:

People
 Agustín Sauto Arana (1908–1986), Spanish football player
 Jiowana Sauto (born 1998), Fijian rugby sevens player
 José Ramón Sauto Hurtado (1912–1994), Mexican football player

Places
 Sauto, Pyrénées-Orientales, France